
Year 309 BC was a year of the pre-Julian Roman calendar. At the time, it was known as the Year of the Dictatorship of Cursor (or, less frequently, year 445 Ab urbe condita). The denomination 309 BC for this year has been used since the early medieval period, when the Anno Domini calendar era became the prevalent method in Europe for naming years.

Events

By place

Asia Minor 
 Ptolemy I Soter personally commands a fleet that captures the coastal regions of Lycia and Caria from Antigonus I Monophthalmus.

Greece 
 Cassander, who has held Roxana, widow of Alexander the Great, in prison for a number of years, has her put to death along with her young son Alexander, the nominal King Alexander IV of Macedon.
 Antigonus attempts to renew his alliance with the Macedonian general and former regent Polyperchon, who still controls part of the Peloponnesus. He sends Heracles, the illegitimate son of Alexander the Great, to Polyperchon to be treated as a pretender to the throne of Macedonia.
 Polyperchon manages to form an army consisting of 20,000 infantry and 1,000 cavalry and challenges Cassander's army. Instead of fighting, Cassander starts negotiations with Polyperchon. By offering to make him a general of his own army and placing him as governor of Peloponnesus, he convinces Polyperchon to change allegiance to him instead of Heracles. As a result, Polyperchon murders Heracles and his mother Barsine.
 Areus I succeeds his grandfather Cleomenes II as king of Sparta.
 A census is carried out in Athens. 21,000 citizens, 10,000 foreign residents and 400,000 others – women, children and slaves – are living in the city.

Carthage 
 Since 480 BC, an aristocratic Council of Elders has effectively ruled Carthage. The titular king of Carthage, Bomilcar, attempts a coup to restore the monarchy to full power. His attempt fails, which leads to Carthage becoming, in name as well as in fact, a republic.
 Leaving his brother Antander to continue the defence of Syracuse, Agathocles lands in North Africa with the aim of distracting the Carthaginians from their siege of Syracuse. Agathocles concludes a treaty with Ophellas, ruler of Cyrenaica. He then takes advantage of the civil unrest in Carthage and nearly succeeds in conquering the city.

Roman Republic 
 The Samnites again rise against Rome. Lucius Papirius Cursor is appointed dictator for the second time and wins a great victory at Longula over the Samnites.

China 

Births 
 Ptolemy II Philadelphus, King of Egypt (d. 246 BC)

Deaths 
 King Alexander IV of Macedon (b. 323 BC)
 Cleomenes II, Agiad King of Sparta
 Heracles, illegitimate son of Alexander the Great and claimant to the throne of Macedon (b. 327 BC)
 Ptolemy (general)  general of Antigonus I Monophthalmus
 Roxana, wife of Alexander the Great, and mother of Alexander IV of Macedon
 Zhang Yi, strategist of the Chinese state of Qin

References